County Down was a UK Parliament constituency in Ireland. It was a two-member constituency and existed in two periods, 1801–1885 and 1922–1950.

Boundaries
1801–1885: The whole of County Down, excluding the Boroughs of Downpatrick and Newry.

1922–1950: The Administrative county of Down, that is the whole of County Down excluding the part in the City of Belfast.

Members of Parliament

1801–1885

1922–1950

Elections

Elections in the 1940s

Elections in the 1930s

Elections in the 1920s

Elections in the 1880s

 Caused by Hill's appointment as Comptroller of the Household.

The electorate was 12,718 in 1881.

 Caused by Vane-Tempest's succession to the peerage, becoming Marquis of Londonderry.

Elections in the 1870s

 Sharman Crawford's death caused a by-election.

Elections in the 1860s

The electorate was 11,470 in 1862.

Elections in the 1850s

 

The Poll Books for part of County Down, showing how each elector voted in the 1857 general election are available in the Public Record Office of Northern Ireland under reference D/671/O/2/7-8.

 

The Poll Books for part of County Down, showing how each elector voted in the 1852 general election are available in the Public Record Office of Northern Ireland under reference D/671/O/2/5-6.

Elections in the 1840s

 Caused by Hill's succession to the peerage, becoming 4th Marquess of Downshire

Elections in the 1830s

 Caused by Arthur Hill's succession as 2nd Baron Sandys

Elections in the 1820s
At the by-election on 15 July 1829 following Frederick Stewart's appointment as a Lord Commissioner of the Admiralty, he was re-elected unopposed.

At the by-election on 9 May 1821 following Robert Stewart vacating his seat, Mathew Forde was returned unopposed.

Elections in the 1810s
At the 1818 and 1820 general elections, Arthur Hill and Robert Stewart were elected unopposed.

At the by-election on 26 February 1817 following the Hon. John Meade's appointment as consul general in Spain, Arthur Hill was returned unopposed.

The electorate was approximately 15,000 in 1815.

At the by-election on 30 May 1812 following Francis Savage's acceptance of the Chiltern Hundreds, Robert Ward was returned unopposed. "Castlereagh ... was not prepared to come in at that moment, and after an unsuccessful attempt to persuade Savage to reconsider his decision, he arranged for his old friend Colonel Ward to stand as a 'stopgap' until the general election".

Elections in the 1800s
At the 1806 and 1807 general elections,  Francis Savage and John Meade were elected unopposed.

At the 1802 general election Francis Savage and Robert Stewart were elected unopposed.

At the creation of the Parliament of the United Kingdom in 1801, the sitting members of the Parliament of Ireland for County Down, Francis Savage and Robert Stewart, continued as MP's for the county.

References

The Parliaments of England by Henry Stooks Smith (1st edition published in three volumes 1844–50), 2nd edition edited (in one volume) by F.W.S. Craig (Political Reference Publications 1973) - including pre-1832 party allegiances.
 - including post-1832 party allegiances.
ElectionsIreland.org

Westminster constituencies in County Down (historic)
Constituencies of the Parliament of the United Kingdom established in 1801
Constituencies of the Parliament of the United Kingdom disestablished in 1885
Constituencies of the Parliament of the United Kingdom established in 1922
Constituencies of the Parliament of the United Kingdom disestablished in 1950